Joseph Henry Ploski (April 16, 1904 – May 17, 1993) was a Polish-American film and television actor. He was known for his appearance in the 1953 film Stalag 17, which starred William Holden, Don Taylor and Otto Preminger.

Ploski Was born in Poland. Initially working as a baker, he saved his money to attend at a drama school. Ploski performed in vaudeville in Hollywood, California, and worked as a straight man for comedian Joe Lewis. He made his Broadway debut in 1932, and also worked in New York with Imogene Coca and Danny Kaye.

Ploski’s first screen credit was in the 1936 film Lady Be Careful. In 1938 he appeared in  There Goes My Heart and Romance in the Dark.

Ploski appeared in over 200 films including Dr. Broadway (1942), The Dark Corner (1946), The Reckless Moment (1949) and Experiment Alcatraz (1950). His final credit was in 1970 for the film Airport. Ploski’s appearances in television programs included Gunsmoke, Bonanza, Tales of Wells Fargo, Wagon Train, The Fugitive, 77 Sunset Strip, The Twilight Zone and Perry Mason.

During World War II Ploski was inducted into the Army, serving as a mess-hall cook.

Ploski died in May 1993 in Los Angeles, California, at the age of 89.

References

External links 

Rotten Tomatoes profile

1904 births
1993 deaths
Polish emigrants to the United States
Polish male film actors
Polish male television actors
20th-century Polish male actors
American male film actors
American male television actors
20th-century American male actors
American bakers
Vaudeville performers
American male comedians
20th-century American comedians